The Black Widow Gang, also known as The Black Widows of Colombia, is the nickname of a group of Colombian serial killers active during the late 2000s and early 2010s. They were charged with the murders of three men in Antioquia, however, it is believed they are responsible for more crimes.

The criminal network, composed mainly of women, was led by Sandra Giraldo and Emilsen Yulima Nataly Rojas. Each member had a different role within the gang, some focused on maintaining relationships with men, others on murdering them, and yet more were in charge of finding lawyers and managing life insurance collections. The total amount from said insurances ranged from one hundred to eight hundred million pesos.

Victims 
One of the victims was Diego Hernández Beltrán, a 60-year-old master builder. According to the investigators, Hernández Beltrán was persuaded by an acquaintance of his to buy life insurance. When they learned of this, the gang decided to take advatange of it and invited Diego to camp at night near a reservoir called El Peñol-Guatapé on September 27, 2008. There, his hands and feet were tied and he was thrown into the reservoir, where he subsequently drowned. Hernández Beltrán's lifeless body was found the next day and claimed by Emilsen, who claimed to be his wife, with the couple having been married for two years. At the time, she claimed that she was the sole beneficiary for the life insurance, worth $150,000,000 pesos. Despite this, the family of the deceased disputed her claims, stating that Diego had never had any romantic bond with the woman.

See also 
 List of serial killers in Colombia

References

External links 
 Pablo Andrés Santa A. (July 25, 2017). Ambition turned them into 'black widows' Diario Q'hubo (in Spanish)

21st-century criminals
Colombian female murderers
Colombian female serial killers
Colombian people convicted of murder
Living people
Mariticides
Murderers for life insurance money
People convicted of murder by Colombia
Prisoners and detainees of Colombia
Year of birth missing (living people)